Volney Voltaire Smith (September 28, 1841 – April 17, 1897) was an American politician who served as the third Lieutenant Governor of Arkansas from 1873 to 1874. He was born in 1841 to Delazon Smith and Eliza Voke Smith, and was also a second cousin of politician and mayor of Chelsea, Massachusetts Edward J. Voke.

Political career

References

Lieutenant Governors of Arkansas
1841 births
1897 deaths
19th-century American politicians